The 2012–13 San Diego Toreros women's basketball team represented the University of San Diego in the 2012–13 college basketball season. The Toreros, members of the West Coast Conference, were led by head coach Cindy Fisher, in her 8th season at the school. The Toreros played their home games at the Jenny Craig Pavilion on the university campus in San Diego, California. For the season the Toreros went 22–10, 12–4 in conference, and finished 2nd in the WCC. They qualified for the 2013 Women's National Invitation Tournament where they lost to Utah in the 2nd Round.

Before the Season
The Toreros were picked to finish fourth in the WCC Pre-Season poll.

Roster

Schedule

|-
!colspan=9 style="background:#97CAFF; color:#002654;"| Exhibition

|-
!colspan=9 style="background:#002654; color:#97CAFF;"| Non-conference Regular Season

|-
!colspan=9 style="background:#002654; color:#97CAFF;"| WCC Regular Season

|-
!colspan=9 style="background:#97CAFF; color:#002654;"| 2013 West Coast Conference women's basketball tournament

|-
!colspan=9 style="background:#97CAFF; color:#002654;"| 2013 Women's National Invitation Tournament

Rankings

References

San Diego
San Diego Toreros women's basketball seasons
San Diego